Taormina (also ,) is a comune (municipality) in the Metropolitan City of Messina, on the east coast of the island of Sicily, Italy. Taormina has been a tourist destination since the 19th century. Its beaches on the Ionian sea, including that of Isola Bella, are accessible via an aerial tramway built in 1992, and via highways from Messina in the north and Catania in the south. On 26–27 May 2017 Taormina hosted the 43rd G7 summit.

History 

The history of Taormina dates back to before Ancient Greece established its first colony on Sicily in 734 BCE. After the fall of the Western Roman Empire, Taormina continued to rank as one of the more important towns of the island. Taormina followed the history of Sicily in being ruled by successive foreign monarchs. After the Italian unification, Taormina began to attract well-off tourists from northern Europe, and it became known as a welcoming haven for gay men and artists.

Main sights 

The present town of Taormina occupies the ancient site, on a hill that forms the last projecting point of the mountain ridge that extends along the coast from Cape Pelorus to this point. This is the likely site of the ancient Arx or citadel, an inaccessible position mentioned by ancient writers. Portions of the ancient walls may be traced at intervals all round the brow of the hill, the whole of the summit of which was occupied by the ancient city. Numerous fragments of ancient buildings are scattered over its whole surface, including extensive reservoirs of water, sepulchres, tessellated pavements, etc., and the remains of a spacious edifice, commonly called a Naumachia, but the real purpose of which it is difficult to determine.

The ancient theatre of Taormina is built for the most part of brick, and is therefore probably of Roman date, though the plan and arrangement are in accordance with those of Greek, rather than Roman, theatres; whence it is supposed that the present structure was rebuilt upon the foundations of an older theatre of the Greek period. The greater part of the original seats have disappeared, but the wall which surrounded the whole cavea is preserved, and the proscenium with the back wall of the scena and its appendages, of which only traces remain in most ancient theatres, are here preserved in an uncommon state of integrity. From the fragments of architectural decorations still extant it has been determined that these were of the Corinthian order, and richly ornamented. Some portions of a temple are also visible, converted into the church of San Pancrazio, but the edifice is of small size.

Other sights include the 12th-14th century Palazzo Corvaja, the Cathedral (Duomo di Taormina) dating from the thirteenth century, a 1635 Baroque fountain, the Palazzo Duchi di Santo Stefano in Gothic style of the fourteenth century, the Church of San Domenico, the Anglican Church of Saint George, and the municipal gardens (Giardini della Villa Comunale).

Culture and tourism 
Just south of Taormina is the Isola Bella, a nature reserve; and further south, situated beside a bay, is the popular seaside resort of Giardini Naxos. Tours of the Capo Sant'Andrea grottos are also available.

The town of Taormina is perched on a cliff overlooking the Ionian Sea. Besides the ancient Greek theatre, it has many old churches, lively bars, fine restaurants and antique shops. The Santuario Madonna della Rocca is one such church. Located on the slope above the town, it commands an impressive view of the coast and Mount Etna to the south, and is accessible on foot via the staired path, Salita Castello. Taormina is approximately a forty-five-minute drive away from Europe's largest active volcano, Mount Etna.

Cultural references 
Taormina inspired the naming of 'Toormina', a suburb of Coffs Harbour, New South Wales, Australia.

The Cole Porter song "Where is the Life That Late I Led" from the musical Kiss Me, Kate references Taormina.

A part of the movie The Big Blue (1988) was set and filmed in Taormina, where the main characters take part in the no limits freediving World Championships.

The British songwriter Mark Knopfler evokes the town in his song "Lights of Taormina" in his 2015 album Tracker.

D.H. Lawrence signed his poem "Snake" with the word "Taormina"—perhaps the location of his "petty" encounter.

The American lawyer Gerald D. McLellan set his legal thriller The Bully (2014) between the North End of Boston and Taormina, with very specific place details of the bar called Naxos.

Season two of The White Lotus, a television comedy-drama, is set in a luxury hotel in Taormina.

Events 
Many exhibitions and events are organized during the summer in Taormina. The exceptional stage for pop and classical concerts, opera and important performances often recorded by television (for example, the ceremony of the Silver Ribbon Award, the Festivalbar, the Kore) is the Ancient Theatre.
Since 1983, the most important performances are realized by Taormina Arte, the cultural institution which organizes music, theatre and dance festivals.

Within the program of Taormina Arte there is the Taormina Film Fest, the heir of the Cinema Festival of Messina and Taormina, dating from 1960, which for about twenty years has hosted the David of Donatello Awards. During the Taormina Film Fest the Silver Ribbons are awarded, a prize created by Italian Film Journalists.

Since 2005, in October, Taormina Arte has organized the Giuseppe Sinopoli Festival, a festival dedicated to its late artistic director.

People 
 Tyndarion (278 BC), tyrant of Tauromenium
 Andromachus, 4th century BC ruler of Tauromenium
 Pancras of Taormina, sent to Sicily in 40 AD by Saint Peter as first Bishop of Tauromenium
 Wilhelm von Gloeden (1856 in Wismar – 1931 in Taormina), German photographer who worked mainly in Italy, best known for his pastoral nude studies of Sicilian boys. Resident from 1880
 Pancrazio Buciunì (1879 - 1963), Gloeden's model, lover and heir
 Gayelord Hauser (1895-1984), Nutritionist and author
 Robert Hawthorn Kitson, (1873 in Leeds - 1947 in Casa Cuseni), British watercolour painter, resident from 1899
 Daphne Phelps (1911 – 2005), Kitson's niece and heir, a writer. Resident from c. 1947.
Thomas Shaw-Hellier (1836 - 1910), commissioned Villa San Giorgio
 Carla Cassola (born 1947), actress and composer.
 Francesco Buzzurro (born 1969), musician
 Guido Caprino (born 1974), actor
 Norma Murabito (born 1987), sprint canoeist

International Relations

Twin towns and sister cities 
Abadan, Khuzestan, Iran

See also 
 List of Catholic dioceses in Italy
 European archaeology

References

Sources

External links 

 
 Taormina Arte official website

 
Coastal towns in Sicily
Municipalities of the Metropolitan City of Messina
Ancient Greek archaeological sites in Italy
Ancient cities in Sicily
Archaeological sites in Sicily
Colonies of sicilian Naxos
Euboean colonies of Magna Graecia
Roman towns and cities in Italy
Populated places established in the 8th century BC
730s BC
8th-century BC establishments in Italy